Austin Joseph Tobin (May 25, 1903 – February 8, 1978) was an American businessman who served as the executive director of the Port of New York Authority, the precursor to the Port Authority of New York and New Jersey, from 1942 until 1972.

Tobin is widely known for authorizing the construction of the original World Trade Center, which was destroyed during the September 11 attacks in 2001.

Background 
Tobin was born on May 25, 1903, to an Irish-American family in Brooklyn, New York City. He was educated at the College of the Holy Cross and Fordham Law School.

Tobin joined the Port Authority in 1927, where he served the first 15 years of his career in the law department. He started out as a law clerk, and was promoted to assistant general counsel in 1935. In 1942, he was appointed as executive director of the Port Authority. During his thirty years as executive director, the agency gained control of LaGuardia Airport, Idlewild (later renamed John F. Kennedy International Airport), and Newark Airport. He oversaw the development of the original World Trade Center, the creation of the Lincoln Tunnel, and the Port Authority Bus Terminal. When Mr. Tobin joined the agency as a law clerk it had 300 employees. When he retired as executive director in 1972, the agency had 8,000 employees and an investment of $2.6‐billion in bridges, airports, ship terminals and other facilities, including the vast World Trade Center.

Tobin is noted for his difference of style from Robert Moses. Most particularly, for his relocation of bus terminal tenants. Furthermore, Tobin is also noted for prioritizing mass transit more so than Robert Moses.

In 1966, Tobin received The Hundred Year Association of New York's Gold Medal Award "in recognition of outstanding contributions to the City of New York".

He died on February 8, 1978, in Manhattan, New York City, at the age of 74.

Legacy

Austin J. Tobin Plaza 
In 1982, the Port Authority decided to rename the outdoor plaza at the World Trade Center, in his honor, as the Austin J. Tobin Plaza. The centerpiece of the plaza was The Sphere, a 25-foot tall bronze sculpture designed by Fritz Koenig. The plaza was destroyed during the September 11 attacks in 2001. The National September 11 Memorial now occupies the site.

See also
 Robert Moses
 The Sphere
 Christopher O. Ward

References

Further reading
 
 Plotch, Philip M. and Jen Nelles (2023), Mobilizing the Metropolis: How the Port Authority Built New York. University of Michigan Press. ISBN 9780472056132.

1903 births
1978 deaths
American real estate businesspeople
College of the Holy Cross alumni
American people of Irish descent
Port Authority of New York and New Jersey people
Henry Laurence Gantt Medal recipients
20th-century American engineers
World Trade Center
Fordham University School of Law alumni